Xenon Racer is a racing video game developed by Italian developer 3DClouds and published by Soedesco for Microsoft Windows, PlayStation 4, Nintendo Switch, and Xbox One. It was released on 26 March 2019.

Gameplay
Xenon Racer is a racing game set in the year 2030. Players race along courses in seven different world locations using vehicles which, according to the game, have been known to be the last cars with wheels, as the cars have been replaced by flying vehicles.

Development
Early in the game's development, the game had been compared to other racing titles, such as F-Zero, Wipeout, and Fast RMX.

In February 2019, Soedesco announced a partnership with Canadian record label Monstercat to bring some of the label's music library into the game.

Reception

The PlayStation 4 version of Xenon Racer received "mixed or average" reviews, according to review aggregator Metacritic.

References

External links

2019 video games
Racing video games
Windows games
PlayStation 4 games
Nintendo Switch games
Xbox One games
Video games developed in Italy
Video games set in the 2030s
Video games set in Boston
Video games set in Canada
Video games set in Dubai
Video games set in Shanghai
Video games set in Miami
Video games set in Tokyo
Video games set in France
Multiplayer and single-player video games
Unreal Engine games
Soedesco games
3DClouds games